This is a list of sculptors – notable people known for three-dimensional artistic creations, which may include those who use sound and light. It is incomplete and you can help by expanding it.



A

B

C

D

E

F

G

H

I

J

K

L

M

N

O

P

Q

R

S

T

U

V

W

X

Y

Z

Lists of sculptors by nationality
List of Albanian sculptors
List of Azerbaijani sculptors
List of Dutch sculptors
List of Hungarian sculptors
List of Polish sculptors
List of Slovenian sculptors

See also
List of female sculptors
List of sculptors in the Web Gallery of Art
List of people by occupation
Sculpture

References

External links
The Historyscoper – sculptors

List of sculptors